Duesenberg Automobile and Motors Company, Inc. was an American racing and luxury automobile manufacturer founded in Indianapolis, Indiana, by brothers Fred and August Duesenberg in 1920. The company is known for popularizing the straight-eight engine and four-wheel hydraulic brakes. A Duesenberg car was the first American car to win a Grand Prix race, winning the 1921 French Grand Prix. Duesenbergs won the Indianapolis 500 in 1924, 1925, and 1927. Transportation executive Errett Lobban Cord acquired the Duesenberg corporation in 1926. The company was sold and dissolved in 1937.

History

Fred and August Duesenberg began designing engines in the early 1900s after Fred became involved with bicycle racing. The brothers designed a vehicle in 1905 and in 1906, formed the Mason Motor Car Company with funds from lawyer Edward R. Mason in Des Moines, Iowa. F.L. and Elmer Maytag acquired a majority stake in the company and renamed it the Maytag-Mason Automobile Company until they sold their stake in 1912. The Duesenbergs moved to Saint Paul, Minnesota and established the first iteration of the Duesenberg Automobile and Motors Company. Eddie Rickenbacker drove the first Duesenberg-designed vehicle to race at the Indianapolis 500 in 1914, placing tenth. The brothers sold their Saint Paul factories in 1919.

During World War I, the Duesenbergs designed and built aircraft engines in Elizabeth, New Jersey. They relocated to Indianapolis, Indiana, in 1920 and re-launched the Duesenberg Automobile and Motors Company, manufacturing the Duesenberg Model A. The Duesenberg brothers assumed engineering roles after signing over the naming rights and patents for Duesenberg engines to promoters Newton E. Van Zandt and Luther M. Rankin. The first ModelA was commissioned by Hawaiian businessman and politician Samuel Northrup Castle. The car had a  straight-eight engine that output 88 horsepower, the largest engine in a commercially available vehicle at the time, and was the first to have hydraulic brakes on all its wheels. Duesenberg continued to build race cars as well, and a Duesenberg race car won the 1921 French Grand Prix, the first American car to do so. Duesenberg cars also performed well at the Indianapolis 500 during the 1920s, winning the race in 1922, 1924, 1925, and 1927.

Van Zandt left the company in 1921 and it struggled financially and entered receivership in 1924. Duesenberg was purchased by Errett Lobban Cord in 1926. August's role in the passenger car side of the business declined after Cord's takeover, and August worked primarily in the Duesenberg's racing division after 1926, designing all Duesenberg race cars built from that year until the company's dissolution. Two years later, Cord had the Duesenbergs make a new model to "outclass" all other American cars. In 1929, the company began selling the Duesenberg Model J, which was powered by a 265-horsepower straight-eight engine. The body and cabin were custom-built by coachbuilders. Prices for the cars ranged from $14,000 to $20,000 at the time. Duesenbergs were considered to be among the most luxurious American cars ever made. Historian Donald Davidson called them the "most prestigious passenger car" in American history and likened them to an American version of the Rolls-Royce. The vehicles were popular with movie stars, royalty, and other wealthy individuals. The company was sold by Cord and dissolved in 1937. The last Duesenberg to be made by the original company was completed in 1940, commissioned by German artist Rudolf Bauer and completed by August Duesenberg after the company had shut down.

Revivals
Several unsuccessful attempts were made to revive the Duesenberg name. August Duesenberg failed to restart the company in 1947, and an attempt by his son, Fritz, and car designer Virgil Exner to revive the brand failed after the production of one concept car in 1966. In 1970, Bernard Miller bought the Duesenberg Corporation and produced the SSJ model from templates taken from the original 1935 SSJ La Grande body. The body was aluminum over ash. There were grand plans for over 300 SSJ's to be produced but over the company's life span of 1970-1974 only 8 were completed. In 1978, Heritage Elite Motors started producing handmade Duesenberg replicas in Elroy, Wisconsin, under the name Duesenberg Motors Company. The "Duesenberg II" retained the styling of the cars from the 1920s and 1930s, but included some modern updates, such as stereo systems, air conditioning, and an automatic transmission. The company produced several models, including the Torpedo sedan and phaeton, and the Murphy roadster. The factory closed in 2001.

Products

Model A (1921–1927)

Duesenberg's first car was the Model A. It is powered by the Duesenberg Straight-8 engine and was the first car to be mass-produced with a straight-eight. The purchase price for a ModelA started at $6,500 ($ in  dollars ). The Duesenberg ModelA introduced several innovative features, such as an overhead camshaft, four-valve cylinder heads, and the first four-wheel hydraulic brakes offered on a passenger car. It had the largest engine of any consumer vehicle at the time of its production.

The Duesenberg Model A experienced various delays going from prototype to production. Deliveries to dealers did not start until December 1921. Sales lagged, and Duesenberg could not meet a 100-vehicles-per-month quota as the Indianapolis plant struggled to roll out one a day. In 1922, no more than 150 Duesenberg ModelAs were manufactured, with only a total of 650 units sold over a period of six years.

Model X (1926–1927)
The Model X is a sportier version of the ModelA with a heavier and longer ( wheelbase) chassis and  engine that enabled it to reach . The most notable differences between the Aand the X were that the latter had hypoid differentials and all its valves were on one side.

The Duesenberg Model X chassis is an upgrade over the ModelA chassis, offering a reworked 260 cu. in. straight-8 engine, an overhead cam, with a new crankshaft, revised valve train, improved pistons and superior intake manifold. Power is 100 hp, which made driving at 100 mph possible. The chassis length increased to 136 inches, with additional reinforcements. Improved leaf springs are mounted above the frame rails, thus, lowering the center of gravity. The Duesenberg ModelX chassis is the rarest Duesenberg street production chassis ever made, with only thirteen ever manufactured. Only five of the Duesenberg ModelXs manufactured are known to have survived.

Model J (1928–1937)

The first Model J prototype was created in 1927 and the first cars were delivered in 1929, shortly before the onset of the Great Depression. About three hundred ModelJs were completed by 1930, short of the original 500-vehicle goal.

The car's  engine was based on the company's racing engines of the 1920s and was manufactured by another Cord company, Lycoming. It output , aided by dual overhead camshafts and four valves per cylinder, making it the most powerful car of its time. Duesenberg historian Randy Ema wrote that the ModelJ spurred change in engine design, "single-handedly (starting) the horsepower race that drove the number of cylinders from twelve to sixteen," but noted those engines still could not match the ModelJ's power output.

Only the chassis and engine of the ModelJ were displayed, as the body and cabin of the car were custom built per custom for luxury vehicles at the time. The company's chief body designer, Gordon Buehrig designed around half of the ModelJ bodies, while the remainder were designed by coachbuilders around the world, including Gurney Nutting, Murphy, and Derham, among others.

The J was available in two versions of chassis with a different wheelbase; a longer one and a shorter one (about ).

The SJ was introduced in 1932. Only 36 units were built. A special version of the SJ, the Mormon Meteor, broke several land speed records.

Investors in New York City originally supported the ModelJ, but following the Stock market crash of 1929, the market for ModelJs switched to Hollywood stars. The one-off SJ Twenty Grand was produced in 1933 for the Century of Progress World's Fair to represent Duesenberg's automotive progress. Two modified ModelJs, known as the SSJ, were produced in 1935 for actors Gary Cooper and Clark Gable. The SSJ reportedly produced  and could go  in less than 8 seconds. Cooper's SSJ sold for $22 million in 2018, making it the most expensive American car ever sold at auction at the time. About 378 of 481 ModelJs of all types still existed as of 2002.

See also
Auburn Automobile
Cord Automobile
Auburn Cord Duesenberg Automobile Museum
Duesenberg Straight-8 engine

References

 
Defunct motor vehicle manufacturers of the United States
Chrysler
Motor vehicle manufacturers based in Indiana
Luxury motor vehicle manufacturers
Defunct companies based in Indianapolis
Vehicle manufacturing companies established in 1913
Defunct brands
1913 establishments in Minnesota
1937 disestablishments in Indiana
Vehicle manufacturing companies disestablished in 1937
Defunct manufacturing companies based in Indiana
Vintage vehicles
1910s cars
1920s cars
1930s cars